Loi Hein Company Limited is a major Myanmar-based company specializing in fast-moving consumer goods (FMCG). Loi Hein is known for its soft drink products, including the Alpine bottled water brand, and an energy drink line called Shark.

Loi Hein was founded in 1996 by Sai Sam Htun, an ethnic Shan.

References

Retail companies of Myanmar
Food and drink companies established in 1996
1996 establishments in Myanmar